HWH may refer to:

HWH, the Indian Railways code for Howrah railway station, West Bengal, India
HWH, the National Rail code for Haltwhistle railway station, Northumberland, England